Deidamia may refer to:

 see Deidamia (Greek myth)
 Deidamia of Scyros, in Greek mythology, a lover of Achilles
 Hippodamia (wife of Pirithous), also known as Deidamia, abducted by the Centaurs in Greek mythology
 Deidamia I of Epirus, wife of Demetrius Poliorcetes in Ancient Greece
 Deidamia II of Epirus, last ruler of the Aeacid dynasty
 Deidamia (opera), by George Frideric Handel
 Deidamia, a former genus of crustaceans, now included in Willemoesia, family Polychelidae
 Deidamia inscriptum, the only moth in the genus Deidamia